Sebastian Radzio (born 2 April 1991) is a Polish footballer who plays as a midfielder for Warta Sieradz. He was forced to take a break from football after suffering from Lyme disease.

Career

Club
In December 2010, he joined Widzew Łódź.

References

External links
 

1991 births
People from Augustów
Sportspeople from Podlaskie Voivodeship
Living people
Polish footballers
Association football midfielders
Widzew Łódź players
Wigry Suwałki players
Ruch Radzionków players
Ekstraklasa players
I liga players
II liga players
IV liga players